Parklife is an album by Blur.

It may also refer to:

"Parklife" (song), a song from the above album
Parklife Music Festival, a former annual Australian music festival held from 2000 to 2013
Parklife (festival), an annual music festival held in Manchester, United Kingdom